Galesburg-Augusta Community Schools was formed in 1951.  It is a public school district that serves students in the neighboring Southwest-Michigan communities of Galesburg and Augusta.  It is the district's stated vision to "be the preferred small-school district in our region."  The superintendent of the district is Wendy Somers.

Schools
In spring of 2010, the Galesburg-Augusta School Board voted to close the district's intermediate school, lowering the number of buildings in the district to three.  As a result, the district now operates a primary school (PK–3rd grade) in Galesburg, a middle school (4th–7th grade) in Augusta, and a high school (8th–12th) in Galesburg.

Galesburg-Augusta Primary School
Located at 315 W. Battle Creek Street in Galesburg, MI, G-A Primary is home to over 380 students.  The school was given a composite grade of "A" by the Michigan Department of Education in 2007–2008.  Mr. Shaun Sportel is the principal of G-A Primary.

Galesburg-Augusta Middle School
Located at 750 W. Van Buren Street in Augusta, MI, G-A Middle School is home to over 360 students.  The school was also given a composite grade of "A" by the Michigan Department of Education in 2007–2008.  Mrs. Shana Wiese is the principal of G-A Middle School.

Galesburg-Augusta High School
Located at 1076 N. 37th Street in Galesburg, MI, G-A High School is home to over 380 students.  The school was given a composite grade of "C" by the Michigan Department of Education in 2007–2008.  Mrs. Lindsey Newton is the principal of G-AHS and Mr. Brian Dolph is the dean of students.

Demographics
Just over 1000 students attend G-A's three schools from grades PK-12. 94% of students in the district are white, 2% are African American, 1% American Indian and 1% Hispanic.  47% of students in the district are eligible for free/reduced-price lunch, compared to a state average of 42%.  An average of $9,324 are spent per pupil, compared to a state average of $9,244.

Recognitions
In early 2001, G-A Middle School Teacher Shirley Kupiecki was named the state's Middle School Teacher of the Year by the VFW.

Athletics
G-A Middle School fields teams in six different sports, while the high school competes in 14 sports.  G-AHS competes as a class C school in the Kalamazoo Valley Association.  G-AHS sports teams have won 13 state championships as sanctioned by the MHSAA.  In 2008, the Galesburg-Augusta softball team won the Division 3 state championship with a 5-0 win over Allen Park Cabrini High School and finished their season with a 40–3 record.

Band
The Galesburg-Augusta band program is one which has been highly successful in its performances and competitions in years past.  Led by band director Mr. Scottie Walker, students may join the band program in 6th grade.  They continue their musical career in the 7th/8th grade band and then further into high school.  The high school concert band attends the MSBOA District Band Festival every February and the middle school does the same in March.  Students have the chance to participate in District Solo and Ensemble and if they(high school students only) receive a "1" rating at the district competition, they advance to the state level.  Auditions for various colleges and university's honors bands are held in the fall and sent to be reviewed by the musical directors.  If students are admitted to the band, they learn music outside of class and perform with a group of students from all over the state.  The G-A Ram Marching Band began competing in the 2013 season and have won the class D division in the first and subsequent season.  The marching band performs on Friday evenings during halftime of the varsity football games.

References

School districts in Michigan
Education in Kalamazoo County, Michigan
1951 establishments in Michigan